Cohesin subunit SA-1 (SA1) is a protein that in humans is encoded by the STAG1 gene. SA1 is a subunit of the Cohesin complex which mediates sister chromatid cohesion, homologous recombination and DNA looping. In somatic cells cohesin is formed of SMC3, SMC1, RAD21 and either SA1 or SA2 whereas in meiosis, cohesin is formed of SMC3, SMC1B, REC8 and SA3.

Structure and Interactions 

SA1 is one of three human homologues of the yeast protein Scc3 which is a core subunit of the cohesin complex (the three human paralogues are SA1, SA2 and SA3). SA1 and SA2 are expressed in somatic cells whereas SA3 is the main SA paralogue in meiotic cells. SA1 stably binds to cohesin via the RAD21 subunit and functions as a platform for other regulatory subunits. SA1 has roles in regulating both cohesin loading and release.

References

External links